Clifton is both a suburb of Bristol, England, and the name of one of the city's thirty-five council wards. The Clifton ward also includes the areas of Cliftonwood and Hotwells. The eastern part of the suburb lies within the ward of Clifton Down.

Notable places in Clifton include Clifton Suspension Bridge, Clifton Cathedral, Clifton College, The Clifton Club, Clifton High School, Bristol, Goldney Hall and Clifton Down.

Clifton

Clifton is an inner suburb of the English port city of Bristol. Clifton was recorded in the Domesday book as Clistone, the name of the village denoting a 'hillside settlement' and referring to its position on a steep hill. Until 1898 Clifton St Andrew was a separate civil parish within the Municipal Borough of Bristol. Various sub-districts of Clifton exist, including Whiteladies Road, an important shopping district to the east, and Clifton Village, a smaller shopping area near the Avon Gorge to the west.

Although the suburb has no formal boundaries, the name Clifton is generally applied to the high ground stretching from Whiteladies Road in the east to the rim of the Avon Gorge in the west, and from Clifton Down and Durdham Down in the north to Cornwallis Crescent in the south. This area corresponds roughly with the city wards of Clifton and Clifton East, although the former also includes the riverside suburb of Hotwells.

Clifton is one of the oldest and most affluent areas of the city, much of it having been built with profits from tobacco and the slave trade. Situated to the west of Bristol city centre, it was at one time a separate settlement but became attached to Bristol by continuous development during the Georgian era and was formally incorporated into the city in the 1830s. Grand houses that required many servants were built in the area. Although some were detached or semi-detached properties, the bulk were built as terraces, many with three or more floors. One famous terrace is the majestic Royal York Crescent, visible from the Avon Gorge below and looking across the Bristol docks. Berkeley Square and Berkeley Crescent, which were built around 1790, are examples of Georgian architecture. Secluded squares include the triangular Canynge Square. The Whiteladies Picture House on Whiteladies Road was converted into offices and a gymnasium in 2001 but it was re-opened as a cinema by Everyman Cinemas in 2016. Clifton Lido was built in 1850 but closed to the public in 1990, it was redeveloped and opened again to the public in November 2008.

On 17 December 1978 a bomb on Queen's Road in Clifton detonated, injuring at least seven people. The Provisional IRA was responsible.

Parts of Clifton itself are now in the process of being pedestrianised.

Demographics
Clifton ward, which includes Hotwells, has a population of 10,452 in 5,007 households, according to adjusted figures for the 2001 census. On the same basis, Clifton East ward has a population of 9,538 in 4,741 households. In Clifton ward, 27% of the adult population (aged 16 to 74 years) is in full-time education.

Geography and transport

Immediately north of Clifton is Durdham Down, a relatively flat and open area, used for recreation purposes. On the western edge of Clifton is Clifton Down, a less open/more wooded area, adjacent to the gorge. Clifton is home to many buildings of the University of Bristol, including Goldney Hall; Isambard Kingdom Brunel's Clifton Suspension Bridge; the Roman Catholic Clifton Cathedral; Christ Church, Clifton Down; Clifton College; Clifton High School; the former Amberley House preparatory school; Queen Elizabeth's Hospital School, The Clifton Club; and Bristol Zoo.

Clifton is served by Clifton Down railway station on the local Severn Beach railway line, and by frequent bus services from central Bristol. It has road links to the city centre and outer western suburbs, and across the Clifton Suspension Bridge to Leigh Woods in North Somerset. Between 1893 and 1934, it was connected to Hotwells by the Clifton Rocks Railway.

Famous and notable residents

 David Anderson - vicar of Clifton Church (1864–1881)
 Lewis Brindley - Videogaming YouTuber and Twitch stream, and founder of the Yogscast.
 Angela Carter - author (whilst studying at the University of Bristol)
 Carla Denyer - councillor for Clifton (2015–present) and Green Party co-leader (2021–present).
 Eliza Walker Dunbar - early female doctor
 Eugénie de Montijo - later Empress Eugenie of France, wife of Napoleon III, was a student in Royal York Crescent where she was known as "Carrots"
 Keith Floyd - restaurateur and TV personality
 W. G. Grace - cricketer and surgeon
 Francis Greenway - renowned Australian architect and designer of The Clifton Club
 John Grimshaw - founder of Sustrans and a voice for cyclists in the UK.
 Sarah Guppy - inventor and collaborator with Isambard Kingdom Brunel
 Charles Hansom - architect of Clifton College
 Henry Selby Hele-Shaw - engineer and inventor of the Hele-Shaw clutch, Professor at the University of Bristol 
 Victoria Hughes - carer for prostitutes whilst cleaning the public toilets on Clifton Down
 Annie Kenney - leading suffragette
 Thomas MacAulay - historian
 Charles Miles - cricketer and soldier
 Peter Nichols - actor and playwright at the Bristol Old Vic
 Frank Norman - novelist and playwright
 Peter O'Toole - actor starting his career at the Bristol Old Vic
 Svetlana Alliluyeva - later known as Lana Peters, Stalin's daughter
 Edward Innes Pocock - Scottish rugby player, member of Cecil Rhodes' Pioneer Column, born in Clifton in 1855
 Reginald Innes Pocock -  British zoologist, Edward's younger brother, born in 1863
 J. D. Sedding - English church architect
 Ellen Sharples and Rolinda Sharples - artist family
 Tom Stoppard - playwright
 John Addington Symonds - writer
 Paule Vézelay - artist
 Richmond Waller - English cricketer and decorated Royal Marines officer
 Fabian Ware -  Founder of the Commonwealth War Graves Commission. Born Clifton 17 June 1869
 Sir Lawrence Weaver - influential editor of Country Life, architectural writer and organiser of the British Empire Exhibition in Wembley in 1924
 William West - artist and builder of Clifton Observatory

In popular culture
In Frances Burney's novel Evelina (1778), young gentlemen are racing their phaetons on the public highways of Clifton (then still outside Bristol), and not without incident.

Part of the background to Philippa Gregory's historical novel "A Respectable Trade" – dealing mainly with the slave trade in late 18th-century Bristol – is the start of construction at Clifton, then a far area outside the city limits as they were at the time. In some passages characters debate whether Clifton could ever become viable and whether investment in real estate there would not be too risky – questions which were evidently quite relevant at the time though to the modern reader the answers are obvious.

The song "Clifton in the Rain" by Al Stewart appears on his first album Bed-Sitter Images.

The song "32 West Mall", which appeared on the 1971 album Stackridge was named after the communal flat that the band shared as their headquarters at 32 West Mall in 1970.

The 1978 children's paranormal drama "The Clifton House Mystery" – produced by HTV; was set in the Clifton area. The plot revolved around a family moving into an old house; and subsequently finding a skeleton of a long-dead person in a hidden room. After some unexplained incidents, they become convinced that a ghost connected in some way with the Bristol Riots of 1831 is haunting the house. The plot is based on the story of the real-life Thomas Brereton, a Dragoon commander who committed suicide after being court-martialled for his lenient approach to suppressing the rioters; although the ghost is named "George Bretherton" in the TV series.

Clifton has been featured in many television sitcoms, including the late 1970s and early 1980s TV series Shoestring, which was set in Bristol and starred Trevor Eve as a radio reporter and part-time sleuth. Much of the BBC series Mistresses was set there, including the 2008, 2009 and 2010 seasons. The TV series Teachers was partly filmed in Clifton, as was teen drama Skins and Being Human. Costume drama The House of Eliott was also largely filmed in Clifton, including at Goldney Hall and Berkeley Square.

The long-running hospital drama Casualty also drew on Clifton for many scenes between 1986 and 2009, when it was filmed in Bristol.

In a 2017 episode of the American historical adventure television series Black Sails, Blackbeard played by Ray Stevenson mentions Clifton as being the home of his mother.

A number of films have also been set in Clifton, including The Truth About Love (2005) starring Dougray Scott and Jennifer Love Hewitt, The Foolish Things (2005), starring Lauren Bacall and Anjelica Huston, and Starter for 10 (2006), starring James McAvoy and produced by Tom Hanks, which was filmed largely on Royal York Crescent. The 1962 film about delinquent teenagers, Some People, starring Kenneth More and Ray Brooks was filmed in and around Clifton.

Exhibitions and galleries
In 2010, Bristol-based art gallery Antlers Gallery exhibited its first exhibition Grotesques. The exhibition was held at a disused retail space in Whiteladies Gate. The project featured work by eleven Bristol based artists.

Natural history
Clifton has a long history of natural history television programming and global conservation, due to the presence of the former Bristol Zoo in the north of the ward and the proximity of the BBC Natural History Unit, which means that more than 25% of the world's wildlife programmes are made in Bristol.
Animal Magic with Johnny Morris was filmed at Bristol Zoo for the duration of the programme (1963–1983).

The UK arm of the conservation charity Ape Action Africa, which rescues and rehabilitates chimpanzees and gorillas in Cameroon, West Africa, operates out of Clifton.

Cliftonwood

Cliftonwood is a small suburb of the English port city of Bristol. It is bounded approximately by the Hotwell Road to the south, Jacob's Wells Road and Constitution Hill to the East and North East, Clifton Vale to the West, and by the gardens of Goldney Hall, a University of Bristol hall of residence, to the north. Due to the geography of the area, there are only two roads in and out: Ambra Vale in the south-west corner, and Clifton Wood Road in the north-east, though there are many footpaths. On some sources the area is spelled Cliftonwood (one word), and in some Clifton Wood (two words).

The suburb is primarily a residential area, with the only commercial premises being the Lion pub. Housing is largely large Victorian terraces, which are often painted bright colours – the coloured houses one can see when standing on Bristol's harbourside and looking up at Cliftonwood are the backs of houses on Ambrose Road and Clifton Wood Terrace.

A medieval Jewish ritual bath known as a mikveh was discovered in 1987 in the former Hotwells Police Station bicycle shed by the Temple Local History group. This is believed to be the origin of the name Jacob's Well, also given to the adjoining road.

Hotwells

Hotwells is a district of the English port city of Bristol. It is located to the south of and below the high ground of Clifton, and directly to the north of the Floating Harbour. The southern entrance to the Avon Gorge, which connects those docks to the sea, lies at the western end of Hotwells. Bristol Cathedral is situated at the eastern end of Hotwells, adjacent to The Council House and College Green. Hotwells forms part of the city ward of Clifton.

References

External links

BID Clifton Village – Non profit making organisation whose aim is to promote and celebrate the unique character of Clifton

 
Areas of Bristol
Spa towns in England
Wards of Bristol
Former civil parishes in Bristol